Dieter Fromm (born 21 April 1948) is a retired East German middle-distance runner who specialized in the 800 metres. He held the indoor 800 m world record for over ten years.

His career ended abruptly in 1976 when, in a race ahead of the 1976 Summer Olympics, for which Fromm was qualified, another runner tread on and damaged his achilles tendon.

He competed for the sports club SC Turbine Erfurt during his active career. His son Alexander married the Olympic sprinter Uta Rohländer.

Achievements

References

1948 births
Living people
People from Bad Langensalza
East German male middle-distance runners
Athletes (track and field) at the 1968 Summer Olympics
Athletes (track and field) at the 1972 Summer Olympics
Olympic athletes of East Germany
European Athletics Championships medalists
Sportspeople from Thuringia